Pargny-sur-Saulx (literally Pargny on Saulx) is a commune in the Marne department in north-eastern France.

Pargny-sur-Saulx is known for its tiles, which are exported sometimes to Singapore, giving it the nickname "the city of the tiles". In addition the town is situated about 18 kilometres from Lac du Der-Chantecoq.

Names of the commune since its creation
In 1179 : Parni
In 1189 : Parneium
later : Parnenium
In 1232 : Pargneium
In 1240 : Pargny
In 1273 : Pargnei-sur-Saulx
In 1300 : Pargny 
In 1397 : Parigny 
In 1401 : Pargney 
In 1508 : Parguy-sur-Saulx
In 1510 : Prygni 
In 1546 : Perriguy 
In 1571 : Parigny 
In 1633 : Pargny-sur-saulx

The Church of Assomption-de-Notre-Dame
 Apse and transept in a flamboyant style,with gargoyles to the south. 18th century nave.

Twin towns
Pargny-sur-Saulx is twinned with:
  Neckarsteinach, Germany

See also
 Champagne Riots
 Communes of the Marne department
 French wine

References

Pargnysursaulx